Laurine Lecavelier (born 26 April 1996) is a French former figure skater. She is a two-time Cup of Tyrol champion (2017, 2019), the 2017 Toruń Cup champion, the 2016 Golden Bear of Zagreb champion, and the 2017 French national champion. She has won a total of seven international events and finished within the top ten at four European Championships.

Personal life 
Lecavelier was born on 26 April 1996 in Enghien-les-Bains, France. She studied sociology.

Career

Early years 
Lecavelier began learning to skate in 2001. Her first coach was Katia Lemaire in Garges-lès-Gonesse.

She debuted on the ISU Junior Grand Prix series in 2011.

2012–13 season 
Lecavelier won her first senior national medal, bronze, at the 2013 French Championships and was sent to the 2013 World Junior Championships in Milan. She finished thirteenth after placing ninth in the short program and fifteenth in the free skate.

2013–14 season 
Lecavelier won silver at the French Championships and was selected to compete at the 2014 European Championships in Budapest. Ranked thirteenth in the short and eleventh in the free, she finished thirteenth overall.

2014–15 season 
Lecavelier made her Grand Prix debut, placing 11th at the 2014 Trophée Éric Bompard. After repeating as the national silver medalist, she finished tenth at the 2015 European Championships in Stockholm, having placed thirteenth in the short and tenth in the free. She was fourth at the 2015 Winter Universiade. She trained under Lemaire in Garges-lès-Gonesse until the end of the season.

2015–16 season 
During the 2015–16 season, Lecavelier was coached by Claude Thévenard at Pôle France in Bercy, Paris. She won a bronze medal at the 2015 International Cup of Nice. She placed twelfth in the short program at the 2015 Trophée Éric Bompard before the event was cancelled due to the November 2015 Paris attacks; the short program standings became the final results. Later that month, she was awarded gold at the NRW Trophy.

Ranked thirteenth in the short and ninth in the free, Lecavelier finished tenth overall at the 2016 European Championships in Bratislava, Slovakia. She then took silver at the Cup of Tyrol in Austria. Her short program placement, thirty-first, kept her out of the final segment at the 2016 World Championships in Boston, United States. Her season was hampered by a stress fracture in the pubic bone.

2016–17 season 
Around June 2016, Katia Gentelet began coaching Lecavelier at Nice Baie des Anges Association in Nice. Lecavelier won bronze at the International Cup of Nice and finished sixth at the Trophée de France, having ranked fourth in the short program and seventh in the free skate. In December, she took gold at the French Championships in Caen.

In January 2017, Lecavelier placed fifth overall (fifth in the short, fourth in the free) at the European Championships in Ostrava, achieving her career-best continental result.  She finished the season at the 2017 World Championships in Helsinki, finishing eighteenth after making the free skate for the first time.

2017–18 season 
After the 2016-17 season, Lecavelier parted ways with coach Katia Gentelet before moving to Colorado Springs, Colorado to train with American coaches Kori Ade and Rohene Ward.

After a tenth-place finish at the 2017 CS Lombardia Trophy, Lecavelier competed on the Grand Prix series, and was assigned to two events for the first time.  She finished eighth at the 2017 Skate Canada International, followed by an eleventh-place finish at the 2017 Internationaux de France.

At the 2017 French Figure Skating Championships, Lecavelier again finished second behind Maé-Bérénice Méité.  At the 2018 European Championships she finished eleventh, while Méité was eighth.  In consequence, Méité was assigned to France's lone ladies' entry at the 2018 Winter Olympics, while Lecavelier was sent to the 2018 World Championships in Milan, where she finished fourteenth.

2018–19 season 
Beginning on the Grand Prix series, Lecavelier finished fifth at the 2018 Skate America.  She next competed at the Inge Solar Memorial, a Challenger event, again placing fifth.  Finishing out the Grand Prix at the 2018 Internationaux de France, she placed ninth.

After winning another silver medal at the French Championships, she reprised her previous career best placement at the European Championships, finishing fifth.  As a result she was chosen over Méité to represent France at the 2019 World Championships in Saitama, where she placed fifteenth.

2019–20 season 
On September 28, 2019, Lecavelier competed at and won France's Master's de Patinage, but did not attend any additional events later in the season.  In January of 2020, it was reported by L'Équipe that Lecavelier had tested positive for cocaine at the Master's, and was facing a competition ban of up to four years.

Programs

Competitive highlights 
GP: Grand Prix; CS: Challenger Series; JGP: Junior Grand Prix

Detailed results 

Personal best highlighted in bold.

References

External links 

 

1996 births
French female single skaters
Living people
People from Enghien-les-Bains
Sportspeople from Val-d'Oise
Doping cases in figure skating
French sportspeople in doping cases
Competitors at the 2015 Winter Universiade